Cercospora capsici is a fungal plant pathogen that causes leaf spot, known as frogeye spot, on peppers.

References

capsici
Fungal plant pathogens and diseases
Eudicot diseases